Staňkov may refer to places in the Czech Republic:

 Staňkov (Domažlice District), a town in the Plzeň Region
 Staňkov (Jindřichův Hradec District), a municipality and village in the South Bohemian Region